Medochemie Ltd is a multinational generics pharmaceutical and consumer healthcare company headquartered in Limassol, Cyprus. Medochemie develops, licenses, manufactures, markets, and distributes branded generic products as well as their own patented brands.

History
Medochemie was established in 1976 by a Cypriot entrepreneur Dr Andreas Pittas with eight employees and three machines: for tablet making, capsule filling and packaging. Medochemie is a founding member of the European Generic Medicines Association (EGA).

Operations
Medochemie employed 1,250 people in 2009. Medochemie has thirteen manufacturing plants and facilities. Nine are located in Cyprus, one in the Netherlands, and three in Vietnam. The company maintains 3,800 marketing authorization licenses for 630 different pharmaceutical products, classified in over 10 therapeutic categories. Its global headquarters are at Medochemie House in Limassol's industrial area.

References

External links

Pharmaceutical companies established in 1976
Multinational companies
Pharmaceutical companies of Cyprus
Companies based in Limassol
Cypriot brands